Last Man to Kill is a 1966 Italian-French crime-spy film written and directed by Umberto Lenzi and starring Roger Browne, Erika Blanc and Dakar. The Italian title translates as A Million Dollars for Seven Killers. It was the fourth and last spy film directed by Lenzi.

Plot

The father of a missing scientist hires a renowned detective to find his son and a valuable secret formula.

Cast 

 Roger Browne as Michael King
 José Greci as  Ellen 
 Antonio Gradoli as  Pavlos 
  Dina De Santis as  Betty 
  Monica Pardo as  Lilli 
 Tor Altmayer as  Figuerez  
 Erika Blanc as  Anna 
 Wilbert Bradley as  Doney 
 Carlo Hintermann as  Manfred Simpson 
 Dakar as Also (as Ales Dakar)  
 Mark Trevor

References

External links

1960s Italian-language films
Italian spy thriller films
1960s spy thriller films
1966 films
French spy thriller films
Films directed by Umberto Lenzi
Films scored by Angelo Francesco Lavagnino
1960s Italian films
1960s French films